The 2016 MXGP of Thailand was the second round of the 2016 FIM Motocross World Championship season. It was held at the Suphan Buri track in Suphan Buri Province on 5–6 March 2016 and included the second rounds of the 2016 MXGP and MX2 world championships. The Suphan Buri Motorsport Land facility made its debut as a host of an MXGP event.

Entry lists
The entry lists for the 2016 MXGP of Thailand were announced on 23 February 2016.

Entry list

MXGP entry list

MX2 entry list

1 Davy Pootjes did not ride due to a broken collarbone sustained at the MXGP of Qatar.

2 Alfie Smith did not ride after separating the ACL in his shoulder at the MXGP of Qatar.

3 Adam Sterry did not ride due to a broken wrist sustained at the MXGP of Qatar.

MXGP

MXGP Practice Times

Free Practice

1 Clement Desalle is riding the grand prix with a broken arm that he sustained at a pre-season race.

MXGP Timed Practice

MXGP Qualifying Race

MXGP Races

Race 1

Race 2

MXGP of Thailand Overall

MX2

MX2 Practice Times

Free Practice

MX2 Timed Practice

MX2 Qualifying Race

1 Dylan Ferrandis dislocated his shoulder and did not take further part in the Grand Prix.

MX2 Races

Race 1

Race 2

MX2 Grand Prix Overall

References

MXGP of Thailand
Thailand